The following teams and players took part in the men's volleyball tournament at the 1972 Summer Olympics, in Munich.

Brazil
The following volleyball players represented Brazil:
 Aderval Arvani
 Alexandre Abeid
 Antônio Carlos Moreno
 Alexandre Kalache
 Décio Cattaruzzi
 Jorge Delano
 João Jens
 José Marcelino
 Luiz Zech
 Mário Procopio
 Bebeto de Freitas
 Paulo Sevciuc

Bulgaria
The following volleyball players represented Bulgaria:
 Aleksandar Trenev
 Brunko Iliev
 Dimitar Karov
 Dimitar Zlatanov
 Emil Trenev
 Emil Valchev
 Ivan Dimitrov
 Ivan Ivanov
 Kiril Slavov
 Lachezar Stoyanov
 Tsano Tsanov
 Zdravko Simeonov

Cuba
The following volleyball players represented Cuba:
 Alfredo Figueredo
 Antonio Rodríguez
 Carlos Dilaut
 Diego Lapera
 Enrique Fortes
 Ernesto Martínez
 Jorge Pérez Vento
 Lorenzo Martínez
 Luis Calderon
 Luis Jiménez
 Orlando Samuell
 Pedro Delgado

Czechoslovakia
The following volleyball players represented Czechoslovakia:
 Drahomír Koudelka
 Jaroslav Penc
 Jaroslav Stančo
 Jaroslav Tomáš
 Lubomír Zajíček
 Milan Řezníček
 Milan Vápenka
 Miroslav Nekola
 Pavel Schenk
 Štefan Pipa
 Vladimír Petlák
 Zdeněk Groessl

East Germany
The following volleyball players represented East Germany:
 Arnold Schulz
 Wolfgang Webner
 Siegfried Schneider
 Wolfgang Weise
 Rudi Schumann
 Eckehard Pietzsch
 Wolfgang Löwe
 Wolfgang Maibohm
 Rainer Tscharke
 Jürgen Maune
 Horst Peter
 Horst Hagen

Japan
The following volleyball players represented Japan:
 Masayuki Minami
 Katsutoshi Nekoda
 Kenji Kimura
 Jungo Morita
 Tadayoshi Yokota
 Seiji Oko
 Tetsuo Sato
 Kenji Shimaoka
 Yoshihide Fukao
 Yuzo Nakamura
 Yasuhiro Noguchi
 Tetsuo Nishimoto

Poland
The following volleyball players represented Poland:
 Alojzy Świderek
 Bronisław Bebel
 Edward Skorek
 Jan Such
 Marek Karbarz
 Ryszard Bosek
 Stanisław Gościniak
 Stanisław Iwaniak
 Wiesław Gawłowski
 Włodzimierz Stefański
 Zbigniew Zarzycki
 Zdzisław Ambroziak

Romania
The following volleyball players represented Romania:
 Cornel Oros
 Cristian Ion
 Gabriel Udişteanu
 Gyula Bartha
 Laurenţiu Dumănoiu
 Marian Stamate
 Mircea Tutovan-Codoi
 Romeo Enescu
 Stelian Moculescu
 Viorel Bălaş
 William Schreiber

South Korea
The following volleyball players represented South Korea:
 Choi Jong-ok
 Jeong Dong-gi
 Jin Jun-tak
 Gang Man-su
 Kim Chung-han
 Kim Geon-bong
 Kim Gwi-hwan
 Lee Seon-gu
 Lee Yong-gwan
 Park Gi-won

Soviet Union
The following volleyball players represented the Soviet Union:
 Valery Kravchenko
 Yuriy Poiarkov
 Yevhen Lapynskiy
 Yefim Chulak
 Vladimir Putyatov
 Vladimir Patkin
 Leonid Zayko
 Yury Starunsky
 Vladimir Kondra
 Vyacheslav Domani
 Viktor Borshch
 Aleksandr Saprykin

Tunisia
The following volleyball players represented Tunisia:
 Abdel Aziz Bousarsar
 Abdel Aziz Derbal
 Hamouda Ben Massaoud
 Mohamed Ben Sheikh
 Moncef Ben Soltane
 Naceur Ben Othman
 Naceur Bounatouf
 Oueil Behi Mohamed
 Rafik Ben Amor
 Raja Hayder
 Samir Lamouchi

West Germany
The following volleyball players represented West Germany:
 Bernard Endrich
 Hans-Georg von der Ohe
 Hans-Ulrich Graßhoff
 Hatto Nolte
 Klaus Meetz
 Klaus-Dieter Buschle
 Rüdiger Hild
 Toni Rimrod
 Ulf Tütken
 Uwe Zitranski
 Volker Paulus
 Wolfgang Simon

References

1972